Weissella soli  is a bacterium from the genus of Weissella which has been isolated from soil in Sweden.

References

 

Bacteria described in 2002
Weissella